6AM is a time on the 12-hour clock.

6AM or variants may also refer to:

"6 AM", a 2013 song by Colombian singer J Balvin 
 "6am", a 2013 song by Fitz and The Tantrums from More Than Just a Dream
6-AM, 6-acetylmorphine

See also
"Six O'Clock", song by Ringo Starr
Dawn, the time when the sun rises

Date and time disambiguation pages